Dynamic duo may refer to:

Arts, entertainment, and media

Music

Groups
Dúo Dinámico (Spanish for Dynamic Duo), a Spanish musical duo formed in 1958 and one of the main precursors of pop music in Spain
Dynamic Duo (South Korean duo), a South Korean hip-hop duo

Albums
Dynamic Duo (Loretta Lynn and Conway Twitty album), album by American country music duo Conway Twitty & Loretta Lynn
Jimmy & Wes: The Dynamic Duo, a 1966 album

Other uses in arts, entertainment, and media
The collective term for DC Comics' partners Batman and Robin
The Dynamic Duo (TV series), a South Korean television show
"Dynamic Duo", a song by Lil Yachty and Tee Grizzley from the former's 2021 mixtape Michigan Boy Boat

Sports
The Dynamic Duo (professional wrestling), a common name for a series of professional wrestling tag teams during the 1980s and 1990s